Freshly was a New York-based prepared meal delivery company that delivers throughout the United States. Founded by Michael Wystrach and Carter Comstock, the company ships one million meals per week and delivers to the contiguous United States. In 2020 Freshly was acquired by Nestlé for US$1.5 billion.

History

Freshly was founded by Michael Wystrach and Carter Comstock in 2012. Influenced by 4-H program initiatives, Wystrach adopted minimal food waste and sustainability into Freshly's menus. The company delivers all meals for a given week and are heated by microwave or  oven without preparation. Freshly also donates excess ingredients and meals to local food banks as part of its partnership with Feeding America.

CEO Michael Wystrach sought to lose weight after he saw a decline in his overall health following years working in investment banking. His family operated a restaurant, The Steak Out in Sonoita, Arizona and a family friend, emergency room doctor Frank Comstock helped prepare nutritious meals. Co-founder Carter Comstock, the son of Frank Comstock, joined Freshly in 2012.

Following a $7 million Series A round, in 2016, the company raised $21 million in a funding round led by Insight Venture Partners. 

In 2017, Nestle led a $77 million funding round that added its USA's Food Division President to Freshly's board and an East Coast kitchen and distribution center built in 2018.

Amid the COVID-19 pandemic, Freshly donated prepared foods worth the equivalent of $500,000 to Meals on Wheels and reported sales up 50% year over year.
In 2020, Freshly expanded to business-to-business food delivery, including to hospitals and  essential service workers. In 2021, Freshly opened a 134,000 square-foot  production facility in Austell, Georgia.

On December 23, 2022, Freshly sent out an email to its subscribers stating, “ It is with a heavy heart that we are announcing that the Freshly meal delivery service will be winding down in early 2023. This is a difficult time as we say goodbye to our incredible community.” This was also posted on their website. They will allow orders to still be placed until January 17th, 2023 with the final orders being shipped until January 21, 2023.

References

External links 

Freshly CEO Michael Wystrach on Cheddar

Subscription services
American companies established in 2012

Transport companies established in 2012

Online food retailers of the United States
Retail companies established in 2012
Internet properties established in 2012
Online food ordering